TC Cassidy is an Australian country music singer-songwriter.

Career
Tania "TC" Cassidy started performing at 10 years of age and signed with Festival Records at 16 years of age. Cassidy co-wrote recorded her self-titled debut album with Garth Porter. At the 1995 Country Music Awards of Australia, Cassidy was nominated for New Talent of the Year and Female Artist of the Year.

In April 2022, Cassidy released "Ain't Too Late (To Start Again)", her first single in thirty years. It reached number 1 on the Country Songs Top 40 Australian Airplay Charts.

In September 2022, Cassidy released her second studio album, Travelling Heart, produced by Golden Guitar winner Angus Gill. Cassidy said "Travelling Heart is a collection of songs that display many emotions, it's a beautiful ride from start to finish with the perfect balance of happiness, grief, anger, humour and heartbreak. I want to take listeners on a heartfelt journey where they connect to the songs on a personal level". Travelling Heart debuted at number 28 on the ARIA Top 50 Albums Chart and number 2 on the ARIA Australian Country Albums Chart.

Discography

Albums

Awards and nominations

Country Music Awards of Australia
The Country Music Awards of Australia is an annual awards night held in January during the Tamworth Country Music Festival. Celebrating recording excellence in the Australian country music industry. They commenced in 1973.
 

! 
|-
|rowspan="2"| 1995 || TC Cassidy || New Talent of the Year||  || 
|-
| TC Cassidy || Female Vocalist of the Year||  || 
|-
| 2023 || Travelling Heart || Traditional Country Album of the Year ||  || 
|-

References

Living people
Australian country singers
Australian women singers
Year of birth missing (living people)